Room is a 2015 British-American-Canadian-Irish drama film directed by Lenny Abrahamson. It is an adaptation of Emma Donoghue's novel of the same name who also wrote the screenplay. Brie Larson  stars as Joy Newsome, an abducted mother held captive for seven years with her five-year-old son Jack, played by Jacob Tremblay. Joan Allen, William H. Macy, and Sean Bridgers feature in supporting roles in the film. Room premiered at the Telluride Film Festival on September 4, 2015, with A24 later providing the film a wide release on January 22, 2016 at over 800 theaters in the United States and Canada. The film grossed a worldwide box office total of over $35 million on a production budget of $13 million. Rotten Tomatoes, a review aggregator, surveyed 303 reviews and judged 93 percent to be positive.

The film garnered awards and nominations in a variety of categories with particular praise for its direction, screenplay and the performances of Larson and Tremblay. Room earned eleven nominations at the 4th Canadian Screen Awards, winning nine including Best Motion Picture, Best Achievement in Direction for Abrahamson, Best Actor in a Leading Role for Tremblay, and Best Actress in a Leading Role for Larson. At the 13th Irish Film & Television Awards, Room won seven awards including Best Film, Best Director for Abrahamson, and Best International Actress for Larson.

At the 88th Academy Awards, Room received four nominations, including Best Picture, Best Director for Abrahamson and Best Adapted Screenplay for Donoghue. Larson went on to win for Best Actress. She also received awards in the Best Actress category at the 73rd Golden Globe Awards, 69th British Academy Film Awards, and 22nd Screen Actors Guild Awards. Donoghue was nominated at the former two award ceremonies, and also won the Independent Spirit Award for Best First Screenplay. Both the National Board of Review, and the American Film Institute included the film in their respective list of the top ten of the year.

Accolades

See also
2015 in film

Notes

References

External links
 

Lists of accolades by film